Bill Henderson with the Oscar Peterson Trio is a 1963 album by Bill Henderson, accompanied by Oscar Peterson.

Track listing
 "You Are My Sunshine" (Jimmie Davis, Charles Mitchell) – 4:35
 "The Lamp Is Low" (Peter de Rose, Mitchell Parish, Maurice Ravel, Bert Shefter) – 2:48
 "All or Nothing at All" (Arthur Altman, Jack Lawrence) – 3:39
 "I Wish You Love" (Léo Chauliac, Charles Trenet, Albert A. Beach) – 3:40
 "Gravy Waltz" (Steve Allen, Ray Brown) – 2:19
 "A Lot of Livin' to Do" (Lee Adams, Charles Strouse) – 2:25
 "I See Your Face Before Me" (Howard Dietz, Arthur Schwartz) – 2:24
 "I've Got a Crush on You" (George Gershwin, Ira Gershwin) – 4:03
 "At Long Last Love" (Cole Porter) – 2:28
 "The Folks Who Live On the Hill" (Oscar Hammerstein II, Jerome Kern) – 3:41
 "Baby Mine" (traditional) – 4:05
 "Wild Is Love" (Ray Rasch, Dotty Wayne) – 2:36

Bonus tracks 
 "Where Are You?" (Harold Adamson, Jimmy McHugh) – 3:36
 "Charmaine" (Lew Pollack, Erno Rapee) – 2:57
 "Young and Foolish" (Albert Hague, Arnold B. Horwitt) – 3:52
 "Stranger on the Shore" (Acker Bilk, Robert Mellin) – 2:34

Personnel

Performance 
 Bill Henderson - vocals
 Oscar Peterson – piano
 Ray Brown – double bass
 Ed Thigpen - drums

Production 
 Dom Cerulli - liner notes
 Will Friedwald
 Jim Davis - producer
 Val Valentin - engineer

References 
Notes

Sources

1963 albums
Bill Henderson (performer) albums
Oscar Peterson albums
Verve Records albums
Vocal jazz albums